Casa Susanna is an American-French documentary film, directed by Sébastien Lifshitz and released in 2022. The film portrays the history of Casa Susanna, a private resort in the Catskills region of New York which served as a haven for transgender women and heterosexual cross-dressing men in the early 1960s before the dawn of the LGBT liberation movement.

The film premiered at the 79th Venice International Film Festival on August 31, and had its North American premiere at the 2022 Toronto International Film Festival on September 9.

References

External links

2022 films
2022 documentary films
2022 LGBT-related films
American documentary films
American LGBT-related films
French documentary films
French LGBT-related films
Transgender-related documentary films
2020s American films
2020s French films
Films directed by Sébastien Lifshitz